Local Environment: The International Journal of Justice and Sustainability is a peer-reviewed academic journal covering the fields of urban planning, environmental policy, and sustainable development with a focus on the intersection of social justice and sustainability in the local environment. The journal's audience and contributors include "researchers, activists, non-governmental organisations, students, teachers, policy makers and practitioners". It is published monthly by Routledge and was established in 1996. The editor-in-chief is Julian Agyeman of Tufts University. Associate editors are Stewart Barr of Exeter (UK), Michelle Thompson-Fawcett of Otago (NZ), and Robert Krueger of Worcester Polytechnic University (USA). According to the Journal Citation Reports, the journal has a 2017 impact factor of 1.928. It was ranked 13th among top urban studies and planning journals and 18th among sustainable development journals in 2018.

References

External links 
 

Environmental social science journals
Geography journals
Urban studies and planning journals
Taylor & Francis academic journals
Publications established in 1996
English-language journals
Routledge academic journals
Monthly journals